Prabmeet Singh Sarkaria   is a Canadian lawyer and politician who has been the president of the Treasury Board of Ontario since June 18, 2021. He has sat as the member of Provincial Parliament (MPP) for the riding of Brampton South since the 2018 Ontario provincial election, representing the Progressive Conservative (PC) Party. He was the associate minister of small business and red tape reduction from 2019 to 2021.

Sarkaria is the first turban-wearing Sikh Cabinet minister in Ontario.

Early and personal life
Sarkaria is a Sikh and grew up in Brampton, Ontario. Sarkaria’s parents immigrated from Punjab, India in the 1980s. His father drove a taxi and mother worked in a factory until they later became small business owners, after purchasing an inn outside of Orangeville. He studied finance at Wilfrid Laurier University and after working at TD Securities, Sarkaria completed his law degree at the University of Windsor. He worked at Miller Thomson as an associate corporate lawyer until his election.

Before entering provincial politics, Sarkaria served on the City of Brampton’s Property Standards Committee, and was an organizer for the annual Hockey for Humanity tournament. He was also the former Ontario Vice President of the World Sikh Organization, an organization that advocates for the Sikh community diaspora.

Sarkaria and his wife, Sarpreet, had their first child, a daughter named Deyva, in May 2020.

Political positions

Sarkaria was nominated to be the Ontario Progressive Conservative Party’s candidate for Brampton South on December 8, 2016.

42nd Parliament of Ontario
Prior to his appointment to the Ontario Cabinet, Sarkaria was the chair of the Select Committee on Financial Transparency and also served on the Standing Committee on Justice Policy. He also previously served as the parliamentary assistant to the solicitor general (formerly known as the minister of community safety and correctional services).

He stepped down as the parliamentary assistant to the solicitor general on June 20, 2019 when he was appointed to the Executive Council of Ontario as the new associate minister of small business and red tape reduction.

In the post, Sarkaria led the government’s bi-annual red tape reduction packages which have become a hallmark of the Ford government. Sarkaria twice received the grade of “A-“ in the Canadian Federation for Independent Business’s annual report card for red tape reduction, the highest grade the province has ever received. He was specifically recognized for regulatory transparency in his annual report, well as the passage of the province's red tape reduction legislation, the Modernizing Ontario for People and Businesses Act, 2020 and two regulatory modernization bills, the Better for People, Smarter for Business Act 2019 and 2020. In 2021, Sarkaria stated that his government’s has actions has resulted a 4.2% reduction in outdated or duplicative regulations and an annual savings to business of $331 million.

COVID-19 
Sarkaria’s profile in Ontario politics significantly increased as he served as the minister responsible for small businesses during the COVID-19 pandemic, a critical time for small businesses throughout the country. Sarkaria became a regular at Premier Ford’s media briefings which were daily throughout most of 2020.

At the beginning of the pandemic Sarkaria launched a Tackling the Barriers portal for small businesses to suggest ideas to the province regarding changes that would help them tackle the challenges of COVID-19.  Ideas received, resulted in over 50 permanent and temporary changes to assist businesses, including permitting 24 hour truck deliveries to grocery stores and pharmacies, tax deferrals and most notably, permitting restaurants to offer alcohol with takeout and delivery orders.

Sarkaria introduced three pieces of legislation to assist small businesses with the challenges of COVID-19 and launched two grant programs, a general up to $20,000 small business grant and a second which focused on refunding small businesses for personal protective equipment costs. Sarkaria’s Supporting Local Restaurants Act, 2020 received significant attention as it capped fees charged by delivery apps to restaurants during the pandemic; a first in the country, which was later replicated in other provinces.

President of the Treasury Board 
As President of the Treasury Board of Ontario, Sarkaria continued to support the province's efforts to recover from the COVID-19 pandemic. Sarkaria oversees the work of the Treasury Board with a focus on expenditure management and fiscal responsibility.

Electoral results

Cabinet posts

References

Living people
Members of the Executive Council of Ontario
Progressive Conservative Party of Ontario MPPs
Politicians from Brampton
Lawyers in Ontario
Canadian politicians of Indian descent
Canadian Sikhs
21st-century Canadian politicians
1988 births